Al-Hakam ibn Awana was the Umayyad governor of Sindh in 731–740. He was appointed by Caliph Hisham ibn Abd al-Malik after the death of the governor Tamim ibn Zaid al-Utbi, Al-Hakam restored order to Sindh and Kush and built secure fortifications at al-Mahfuzah and al-Mansur, and proceeded to retake lands previously conquered by al-Junayd.

Arab sources do not mention details of the campaigns, but Indian sources recorded some victories over the Arab forces. al-Hakam led numerous campaigns against neighboring Indian kingdoms, but failed to reconquer the lands previously lost after al-Junayd departed India. Al-Hakam died during a battle with the Indian kingdoms.

References 

Umayyad governors of Sind
8th-century Arabs
Banu Kalb